was a Japanese TV personality and actor. He hosted the Asahi Broadcasting Corporation quiz show Panel Quiz Attack 25 continuously for thirty-six years from its start in April 1975 until he was forced to step down due to poor health at the end of March 2011. His signature catchphrase on the show is "Attack Chance!"

An avid reader, Kodama hosted a TV book review show. He also published his own books. He was a voice actor for the voice of Robert Stephenson in the Japanese version of the 2004 animated movie Steamboy.

Kodama died of stomach cancer at a hospital in Chuo, Tokyo on 16 May 2011.

Works

Film
The Hidden Fortress (1958, Toho)
The Bad Sleep Well| (1960, Toho)
 (1960, Toho) - Okano
 (1960, Toho) - Okano
 (1961, Toho) - Junkichi Ishiyama
Kuroi gashû: Aru sonan (1961) - Hideo Iwase
Chūshingura: Hana no Maki, Yuki no Maki (1962) - Han'nojo Sugaya
Kokusai himitsu keisatsu: Shirei dai hachigo (1963) - Anzai
Onna no rekishi (1963)
Danchi: Nanatsu no taizai (1964) - Kôji Kawashima
Taiheiyô kiseki no sakusen: Kisuka (1965) - Fukumoto
Senjo ni nagareru uta (1965)
Japan's Longest Day (1967, Toho) - Chamberlain Yasuhide Toda
Battle of the Japan Sea (1969, Toho)
Yoba (1976) - Ihara
Steamboy (2004, Toho) - Robert Stephenson (voice)
Hero (2007, Toho) - Toshimitsu Nabeshima

Drama
NHK taiga drama series
Ōgon no Hibi (1978) - Tokugawa Ieyasu
Shishi no Jidai (1980) - Mizuhoya Usaburō
Sanga Moyu (1984) - Fumiya Shimaki
Takeda Shingen (1988) - Obu Toramasa
Taiheiki (1991) - Hōjō Sadaaki
Ryomaden (2010) - Sakamoto Hachihei
 (1970–1974, TBS)
 (1971–1975, NTV)
Shiroi Kyotō (1978, Fuji TV) - Hitoshi Sekiguchi
Omoide Zukuri (1981, TBS)
Musashibō Benkei (1986, NHK) - Togashi Yasuie
Hero (2001, Fuji TV) - Toshimitsu Nabeshima
 (2006, Fuji TV)
 (2008, Fuji TV)
Code Blue (2008–2010, Fuji TV) - Tadokoro Yoshiaki

Other TV programmes
 (1974–1975, Mainichi Broadcasting System, Inc.)
 (1975–2011, Asahi Broadcasting Corporation)
 (2007–2009, NHK General TV)
Welcome to the words house(NTV)

Radio
 (2003–2011, Nippon Broadcasting System, Inc. (LF))
 (2009–2011, LF)

After his death
Asahi Broadcasting Corporation broadcast the special nationwide programme of "Attack 25" on the 22nd day of May 2011 to mourn his death. In the programme, two Asahi presenters Yasuyuki Urakawa and Akiko Kato told viewers all over Japan about Kiyoshi Kodama and the 36-year history of "Attack 25", showing famous scenes in "Attack 25" including his signature Attack Chance catchphrase, treasured pictures of him owned by TV Asahi, and comments of memories from special guests. Urakawa who substituted for Kodama since April 2011, hosted Attack 25 until March 2015, after which he was replaced by Shōsuke Tanihara.

References

External links
 Official website 
 

1934 births
2011 deaths
Deaths from stomach cancer
Male actors from Tokyo
Japanese male film actors
Japanese male television actors
Japanese television personalities
Gakushuin University alumni
21st-century Japanese male actors
Deaths from cancer in Japan